Aechmea rubrolilacina is a species of flowering plant in the genus Aechmea. This species is endemic to the State of Espírito Santo in eastern Brazil.

References

rubrolilacina
Plants described in 1993
Flora of Brazil